Shikhov (masculine; Russian: Шихов), Shikhova (feminine) or Shikhovo (gender-neutral) may refer to

Places
İşıqlı, Qubadli (formerly Shikhova), a village in Azerbaijan
Bibiheybət (formerly Shikhovo), a municipality in Baku, Azerbaijan
Shikhov Beach, a resort area in Bibiheybət, Azerbaijan

People
Galina Shikhova (born 1940), Soviet alpine skier
Konstantin Shikhov (born 1984), Russian sledge hockey player
Yekaterina Shikhova (born 1985), Russian speed skater